Grant Lawrie (born 29 November 1958) is a former Australian rules footballer who played with Fitzroy and St Kilda in the Victorian/Australian Football League (VFL/AFL).

Lawrie, who came from Bulleen-Templestowe, started his VFL career as a half forward flanker and on one occasion kicked four goals against Collingwood in his debut season. After putting together 14 appearances in his first three years at the club, Lawrie became an integral part of the team from 1981 as a hard running defender. He played all 22 games in 1982 and polled 10 Brownlow Medal votes to finish at Fitzroy's second best vote getter that year. The following season he was selected to represent Victoria at interstate football.

Nicknamed "Sticks", Lawrie played seven finals during his time with Fitzroy but missed the 1986 preliminary final. He retired after the 1988 VFL season and spent 1989 at Box Hill. St Kilda got him back to the league in 1990 when they picked him up with the 91st selection of national draft.

During his coaching career, Lawrie was senior coach of Banyule, Greensborough, West Preston and the Western Jets.

References

1958 births
Fitzroy Football Club players
St Kilda Football Club players
Box Hill Football Club players
Greensborough Football Club coaches
Australian rules footballers from Victoria (Australia)
Living people
Victorian State of Origin players